Lin Weiguo (born July 25, 1970) is a Chinese IM-titled chess player. He was National Chess Champion three times in 1991, 1992 and 1997.

He competed for the China national chess team twice at the Chess Olympiads (1992–1994) with an overall record of 14 games played (+6, =5, -3); one World Men's Team Chess Championship (1993) with an overall record of 9 games played (+0, =5, -4); and two Men's Asian Team Chess Championships (1993–1995) with an overall record of 9 games played (+4, =1, -4).

See also
Chess in China

References

External links
Lin Weiguo - New In Chess. NICBase Online.
FIDE Chess Player card - Individual Calculations

Chessmetrics Career Ratings for Lin Weiguo
Elo rating with world rankings and historical development since 1990 (benoni.de/schach/elo) for Lin Weiguo

1970 births
Living people
Chess players from Hubei
Chess International Masters